Baron Eduardus (Edouard) Josephus Franciscus de Paulo Osy de Zegwaart (24 March 1832 – 5 December 1900) was a Belgian politician.

Political career
Edouard Osy de Zegwaart was a member of the provincial council for the canton of Antwerp from 5 July 1864 until 22 May 1876. He was a senator in the Belgian Senate from 1877 until 1878 and a member of the Belgian Chamber of Representatives from 1880 until 1889. In 1888 he was a founding member of the Antwerp section of the Belgian Anti-Slavery Society.

Osy de Zegwaart was governor of the province of Antwerp from 26 January 1889 until his death on 5 December 1900. This made him president of the provincial committee of the Commission Royale des Monuments, in which he took an active interest.

He died at home, in Hoogboom Castle.

References

1832 births
1900 deaths
Governors of Antwerp Province
People from Deurne, Belgium